Brian Patrick Herbert (born June 29, 1947) is an American author who lives in Washington state. He is the elder son of science fiction author Frank Herbert (who died in 1986).

Brian Herbert's novels include Sidney's Comet, Prisoners of Arionn, Man of Two Worlds (written with his father), and Sudanna Sudanna. In 2003, Herbert wrote a biography of his father titled Dreamer of Dune: The Biography of Frank Herbert. The younger Herbert has edited The Songs of Muad'dib and the Notebooks of Frank Herbert's Dune. Herbert has also created a concordance for the Dune universe based on his father's notes, though, according to the younger Herbert, there are no immediate plans to publish it.

Career
Herbert is known for his collaborations with author Kevin J. Anderson, with whom he has written multiple prequels (and some sequels) to his father's landmark 1965 science fiction novel, Dune, all of which have made the New York Times Best Seller list. The duo began with the trilogies Prelude to Dune  (1999–2001) and Legends of Dune (2002–2004). Brian and Anderson next published Hunters of Dune (2006) and Sandworms of Dune (2007), two sequels to Frank Herbert's original Dune series, which was left incomplete at the end of Frank's sixth Dune novel, Chapterhouse: Dune. These novels are based on an outline and notes left behind by Frank Herbert after his 1986 death for what he referred to as Dune 7, his own planned seventh novel in the series. In 2008, Brian and Anderson began publishing Heroes of Dune, a series of four novels which take place between the first five novels of Frank Herbert's six original Dune series, but only two were  published. The inter prequels were set aside, first for the Great Schools of Dune trilogy (2012-2016), and later for the Caladan trilogy. Furthermore, Brian, along with Kevin, has also written the Dune short stories (2001-2017). Brian Herbert's Dune novels have received mixed reception in comparison to Frank Herbert's original novels.

Works

Individual

 Classic Comebacks (1981)
 Incredible Insurance Claims (1982)
 Sidney's Comet (1983)
 The Garbage Chronicles (1985)
 Man of Two Worlds (1986) (with Frank Herbert)
 Sudanna, Sudanna (1986)
 Prisoners of Arionn (1987)
 The Race for God (1990)
 Memorymakers (1991) (with Marie Landis)
 Blood on the Sun (1996) (with Marie Landis)
The Little Green Book of Chairman Rahma (2014)

Timeweb series
 Timeweb (2006)
 The Web and the Stars (2007)
 Webdancers (2008)

Non-fiction
 Dreamer of Dune: The Biography of Frank Herbert (2003)
 The Forgotten Heroes: The Heroic Story of the United States Merchant Marine (2004)

Dune books
(all with Kevin J. Anderson)

Prelude to Dune trilogy
 Dune: House Atreides (1999)
 Dune: House Harkonnen (2000)
 Dune: House Corrino (2001)

Legends of Dune
 Dune: The Butlerian Jihad (2002)
 Dune: The Machine Crusade (2003)
 Dune: The Battle of Corrin (2004)

Collection
 The Road to Dune (2005) (also with Frank Herbert)
 Sands of Dune (2022)

Dune 7
 Hunters of Dune (2006)
 Sandworms of Dune (2007)

Heroes of Dune
 Paul of Dune (2008)
 The Winds of Dune (2009)
 The Throne of Dune (postponed indefinitely; originally titled Irulan of Dune)
 Leto of Dune (postponed indefinitely; title may be changed to Golden Path of Dune)

Great Schools of Dune
 Sisterhood of Dune (2012)
 Mentats of Dune (2014)
 Navigators of Dune (2016)

The Caladan Trilogy
Dune: The Duke of Caladan (2020)
Dune: The Lady of Caladan (2021)
Dune: The Heir of Caladan (2022)

Dune short stories
 "Dune: A Whisper of Caladan Seas"
 "Dune: Hunting Harkonnens"
 "Dune: Whipping Mek"
 "Dune: The Faces of a Martyr"
 "Dune: Sea Child"
 "Dune: Treasure in the Sand"
 "Dune: Wedding Silk"
 "Dune: Red Plague"
 "Dune: The Waters of Kanly"
 "Dune: Blood of the Sardaukar"

Hellhole series
with Kevin J. Anderson
Hellhole (2011)
Hellhole Awakening (2013)
Hellhole Inferno (2014)

References

External links
 
 
 , Authors@Google video talk. October 7, 2008
 Brian Herbert Interview with AMCtv.com
Modern Signed Books BlogTalkRadio Interview with Rodger Nichols about The Little Green Book of Chairman Rahma

1947 births
Living people
20th-century American novelists
21st-century American novelists
American male novelists
American science fiction writers
American book editors
Writers from Bainbridge Island, Washington
Writers from Seattle
20th-century American male writers
21st-century American male writers
Novelists from Washington (state)